The 2018 Cheltenham Gold Cup (known as the Timico Gold Cup for sponsorship reasons) was the 90th annual running of the Cheltenham Gold Cup horse race and was held at Cheltenham Racecourse on Friday 16 March 2018.
The race was won by Native River.

Details
 Sponsor: Timico
 Winner's prize money: 
 Going: Soft
 Number of runners: 15 
 Winner's time: 7m 2.60s

Full result

 Amateur jockeys indicated by "Mr".
* The distances between the horses are shown in lengths or shorter. s.h. = short-head. nk = neck. † Trainers are based in Great Britain unless indicated. PU = pulled-up. F = fell. UR = unseated rider

References

External links
2018 Cheltenham Gold Cup at Racing Post
Cheltenham Gold Cup Winners

Cheltenham Gold Cup
 2018
Cheltenham Gold Cup
2010s in Gloucestershire
Cheltenham Gold Cup